Bandy was held as a demonstration sport at the 1952 Winter Olympics in Oslo. A men's program was included but not a women's program.

Sweden, Norway and Finland participated with their best players and won one match each. Sweden won the tournament thanks to the best goal difference, with Norway second and Finland third. The three participating countries regularly played friendlies, but this was the first official international bandy tournament since 1913.

Though bandy was played in the Soviet Union, they did not partake in the event because they did not compete in any international bandy competitions at that point. While agreements had previously been made to play friendlies against Sweden in the late 1940s, the plans did not come to fruition.

The Olympic bandy games were noticed by the sport's leaders from the Soviet Union, who invited the three Nordic countries to a friendly four nation bandy tournament in 1954. The first men's Bandy World Championships were not held until five years later, in 1957.

Medalists

Results

Final rankings

References

External links
 1952 Winter Olympics pp. 215–216, 256

Olympics
Discontinued sports at the Winter Olympics
1952 Winter Olympics events
1952 in bandy
International bandy competitions hosted by Norway
Men's events at the 1952 Winter Olympics